Michael McHugh (born August 16, 1965) is an American former ice hockey left wing. He played 20 games in the National Hockey League with the Minnesota North Stars and San Jose Sharks from 1988 to 1991. The rest of his career, which lasted from 1988 to 1998, was spent in the minor leagues. He was drafted by the Minnesota North Stars with the first pick in the 1988 NHL Supplemental Draft.

Playing career
After playing four seasons at the University of Maine, McHugh made his professional debut with the American Hockey League's Maine Mariners, appearing in one game at the end of the 1987–88 season. His first full season of professional hockey was 1988–89, during which he played in 70 games with the International Hockey League's Kalamazoo Wings and three NHL games with the North Stars.

After two more seasons spent mostly with Kalamazoo, with a few appearances with the North Stars, McHugh joined the expansion San Jose Sharks in the 1991 NHL Dispersal Draft. He appeared in eight games with the Sharks during their inaugural season of 1991–92, and tallied his first and only NHL goal as a Shark. This was his last NHL experience.

Though his NHL career was brief, McHugh became a star in the American Hockey League. In seven AHL seasons with the Springfield Indians and Hershey Bears, he scored 143 goals and added 239 assists. He was awarded the Jack A. Butterfield Trophy as MVP of the 1997 Calder Cup playoffs, as he scored nine goals and seven assists while leading Hershey to the AHL Championship.

In his brief NHL career, McHugh appeared in 20 games. His one goal scored in 1991–92 was his lone NHL point.

Post-playing career
McHugh currently lives in Hershey, Pennsylvania with his wife; they have two daughters.

Career statistics

Regular season and playoffs

Awards and honors

References

External links

1965 births
Living people
AHCA Division I men's ice hockey All-Americans
American men's ice hockey left wingers
Hershey Bears players
Ice hockey people from Maine
Kalamazoo Wings (1974–2000) players
Maine Black Bears men's ice hockey players
Maine Mariners players
Minnesota North Stars draft picks
Minnesota North Stars players
National Hockey League supplemental draft picks
People from Sagadahoc County, Maine
San Jose Sharks players
Springfield Indians players